John Trent may refer to:

 John Trent (author), American author of marriage and family books
 John Trent (director) (1935–1983), British-born Canadian film director
 John Trent (actor) (1906–1966), American aviator and actor